Papaipema aweme, known generally as the Aweme borer moth or small white-aster moth, is a species of cutworm or dart moth in the family Noctuidae. It is found in North America.

The MONA or Hodges number for Papaipema aweme is 9504.

References

Further reading

 
 
 

Papaipema
Articles created by Qbugbot
Moths described in 1908